Neil Douglas Walter  (born 1942) is a New Zealand diplomat, and a former Administrator of Tokelau, a territory of New Zealand. He served from February 1988 until 1990, and again from 1 March 2003 to 17 October 2006.

Biography
In his early career in the Foreign Service, Walter served in Thailand, New York, and Samoa.  In 1981, Walter was posted to New Zealand's Embassy in Paris, where he was the New Zealand Permanent Representative to UNESCO.  In 1985, Walter became New Zealand's deputy High Commissioner to London.

Walter was New Zealand's Ambassador to Indonesia from 1990–1994, and served as New Zealand's Ambassador to Japan from 1997–1999.  In 1999, Walter became Secretary of the New Zealand Ministry of Foreign Affairs, until his retirement from the diplomatic service in 2002. He was one of three people to address the United Nations Special Committee on Decolonization, 10th Meeting, June 23, 2003.

Walter was the Chairman of the Environmental Risk Management Authority until 2008 and the chair of NZ On Air until 2012. He also undertakes various reviews and assessments for the NZ Government. His 2009 report on the State Services Commission's ambitious and ill-fated GSN information technology project led to the resignation of the Deputy State Services Commissioner and Government CIO Laurence Millar.

Honours
In the 2002 Queen's Birthday and Golden Jubilee Honours, Walter was appointed a Companion of the New Zealand Order of Merit, for services as Secretary of Foreign Affairs and Trade.

Personal life
He is married and has one son and two daughters. His son, Stephen Walter, is a lead negotiator on climate change for the New Zealand Ministry of Environment. His brother David Walter of Stratford is a former Chairman of the Taranaki Regional Council and mayor of the Stratford District Council.

References

External links
 Neil Walter biography at the Victoria University of Wellington
 SSC Inquiry 

Walter, Neil Douglas
Walter, Neil Douglas
Walter, Neil Douglas
Companions of the New Zealand Order of Merit
Ambassadors of New Zealand to Japan
Walter, Neil Douglas
Permanent Delegates of New Zealand to UNESCO
Ambassadors of New Zealand to Indonesia